Sulley Shittu (born 15 April 1946 in Koforidua) is a Ghanaian amateur fly/bantamweight, and professional bantamweight boxer of the 1960s and 1970s who as an amateur represented Ghana at flyweight in the Boxing at the 1964 Summer Olympics in Tokyo, Japan, losing to John McCafferty of the Republic of Ireland, won silver at the 1965 All-Africa Games in Brazzaville, won a gold medal at flyweight in the Boxing at the 1966 British Empire and Commonwealth Games in Kingston, Jamaica, represented Ghana at bantamweight in the Boxing at the 1968 Summer Olympics in Mexico City, losing to Horst Rascher of West Germany, and won a gold medal at bantamweight in the Boxing at the 1970 British Commonwealth Games in Edinburgh, Scotland and as a professional won the African Boxing Union (ABU) bantamweight title, and Commonwealth bantamweight title.

1964 Olympic results
Below is the record of Sulley Shittu, a Ghanaian flyweight boxer who competed at the 1964 Tokyo Olympics:

 Round of 32: defeated Jumaat Ibrahim (Malaysia) by knockout
 Round of 16: lost to Sean McCafferty (Ireland) by decision, 2-3

References

External links

1946 births
Bantamweight boxers
Flyweight boxers
Living people
Olympic boxers of Ghana
Boxers at the 1964 Summer Olympics
Boxers at the 1968 Summer Olympics
Commonwealth Games gold medallists for Ghana
Boxers at the 1966 British Empire and Commonwealth Games
Boxers at the 1970 British Commonwealth Games
Ghanaian male boxers
African Boxing Union champions
Commonwealth Games medallists in boxing
African Games silver medalists for Ghana
African Games medalists in boxing
Boxers at the 1965 All-Africa Games
Medallists at the 1966 British Empire and Commonwealth Games
Medallists at the 1970 British Commonwealth Games